William Donald MacLaughlin (November 24, 1906 – May 28, 1986) was an American actor. The son of a doctor, MacLaughlin was born November 24, 1906, in Webster, Iowa. He studied speech and English at Iowa Wesleyan University, Northwestern University, and the University of Arizona.

Television 
MacLaughlin originated the role of lawyer Chris Hughes on As the World Turns in 1956, and played the role until his death in 1986. Contract negotiations kept him (and his on-screen wife Helen Wagner) off the soap for most of the early 1980s, but the show finally welcomed the two back in a big storyline with heavy uses of past clips from the show. In the story, Chris and his wife Nancy were celebrating their fiftieth wedding anniversary. In real life, As the World Turns was celebrating its thirtieth anniversary on the air. 

MacLaughlin also was a member of the cast of Gang Busters.

Radio 
Prior to TV, MacLaughlin was active on radio, beginning in 1933. He starred as the title character on radio's David Harding, Counterspy in the 1940s and 1950s. In 1945, he joined the cast of The Romance of Helen Trent, in the role of Dwight Swanson, "a rancher who becomes interested in Helen Trent." MacLaughlin's other roles on radio included those listed in the table below.
{| class="wikitable"
|-
! Program !! Role
|-
| As the Twig Is Bent || Kit Collins
|-
| Chaplain Jim || Chaplain Jim
|-
| The Road of Life || Dr. Jim Brent
|-
| Tennessee Jed || Tennessee Jed Sloan
|-
| The Zane Grey Theater || Tex Throne
|}

He was also in the cast of Buck Private and His Girl.

 Stage 
MacLaughlin appeared in a 1948 Broadway production of Thornton Wilder's play, The Happy Journey to Trenton and Camden and in Virginia Reel (1947) and The Fifth Column'' (1940).

Personal life 
MacLaughlin married Mary Prugh, a newspaperwoman. They had three children.

Death 
After a brief illness, Maclaughlin died on May 28, 1986, at his daughter's home in Goshen, Connecticut, and is buried in Dover, Vermont.

References

External links 

1906 births
1986 deaths
20th-century American male actors
American male radio actors
American male soap opera actors
American male stage actors
American male television actors
Male actors from Iowa
People from Keokuk County, Iowa
Burials in Vermont
Place of death missing